The 1959 Sun Bowl featured the New Mexico State Aggies and the North Texas State Eagles.

Background
New Mexico State represented the Border Intercollegiate Athletic Association (BAAA) and finished tied for third in Warren B. Woodson's second season as head coach for the Aggies. North Texas State was co-champion of the Missouri Valley Conference with Houston in Odus Mitchell's 14th year. This was the Eagles first bowl game since the 1948 Salad Bowl.

Game summary
New Mexico State - Atkins 57 yard touchdown pass from Johnson (Gaiters run), 14:20 remaining  
New Mexico State - Locklin fumble recovery (run failed), :01 remaining  
New Mexico State - B. Kelly 15 yard touchdown pass from Johnson (Villanueva kick), 4:05 remaining  
North Texas State - Christie 51 yard punt return (Perkins pass from Duty), :01 remaining  
New Mexico State - Gaiters 44 yard touchdown run (Villanueva kick), 13:50 remaining

Charley Johnson was named Sun Bowl MVP, going 7–of-15 with 124 yards passing and two touchdowns along with 31 yards rushing. Billy Ray Locklin had a defensive touchdown for the Aggies when he recovered a fumble as they led 21–0 at halftime. The Eagles could only muster a second half touchdown by Billy Christle and even though Abner Haynes had 174 all purpose yards, Bob Gaiters put the game out of reach with his 44 yard touchdown.

Aftermath
New Mexico State returned to the Sun Bowl the following season after winning the BIAA once again. Mitchell coached the Eagles for seven more years and won the conference title twice. The program did not reach another bowl game until the 2001 New Orleans Bowl, 42 years later.

References

Sun Bowl
Sun Bowl
New Mexico State Aggies football bowl games
North Texas Mean Green football bowl games
Sun Bowl
December 1959 sports events in the United States